The 2012 Nova Scotia Scotties Tournament of Hearts, Nova Scotia's women's provincial curling championship, was held from January 25 to 29 at the CFB Halifax Curling Club in Halifax, Nova Scotia. The winning team of Heather Smith-Dacey, represented Nova Scotia at the 2012 Scotties Tournament of Hearts in Red Deer, Alberta, where they finished with a 4-7 record.

Teams

Standings

Results

Draw 1
January 25, 1:00 PM

Draw 2
January 25, 7:00 PM

Draw 3
January 26, 1:00 PM

Draw 4
January 26, 7:00 PM

Draw 5
January 27, 1:00 PM

Draw 6
January 27, 7:00 PM

Draw 7
January 28, 9:00 AM

Tiebreaker
January 28, 7:00 PM

Playoffs

Semifinal
January 29, 9:00 AM

Final
January 29, 3:00 PM

Qualification rounds

Round 1
The first qualification round for the 2012 Nova Scotties Tournament of Hearts took place from December 9 to 11, 2011 at the Wolfville Curling Club in Wolfville, Nova Scotia. The format of play was an open-entry triple knockout qualifying six teams to the provincial playoffs

Teams

A Event

B Event

C Event

Round 2
The second qualification round for the 2012 Nova Scotties Tournament of Hearts took place from January 6 to 8 at the Bridgetown Curling Club in Bridgetown, Nova Scotia. The format of play was an open-entry double knockout qualifying two teams to the provincial playoffs.

Teams

A-Event

B-Event

References

Nova Scotia
Curling competitions in Halifax, Nova Scotia
Scotties Tournament of Hearts
Nova Scotia Scotties Tournament of Hearts